Diana Amft (born 7 November 1975 in Gütersloh, North Rhine-Westphalia) is a German film and television actress and children's writer. She is best known for playing Gretchen Haase in the RTL sitcom Doctor's Diary.

Biography
Diana Amft was born in Gütersloh. Her father was a janitor. She grew up in Herzebrock-Clarholz and one of her after school jobs was in a video library. She completed her vocational training as a legal administrator at the Rheda-Wiedenbrück district court. She took singing lessons in Bielefeld and unsuccessfully applied to study at the Folkwang Hochschule in Essen.

She was accepted at the Schauspielschule Zerboni in Munich when she was twenty years old, and, following appearances in theatre, she was cast for her first roles on television in 1999.

Amft became better known following her role as Inken in the Film Mädchen, Mädchen, which was unexpectedly successful, and its sequel Mädchen, Mädchen 2 – Loft oder Liebe. In 2002, the film Knallharte Jungs, in which she was the leading actress, won the Deutscher Comedypreis as best cinema film. She regards her leading role in the series Doctor’s Diary as a breakthrough.

On the soundtrack of Mädchen Mädchen 2 - Loft oder Liebe, she sang Funky Freakshow with Tears, the girl group launched by Popstars in Switzerland. In 2017, she promoted the Yogurette candy bar.

Between 2010 and 2018 she authored a total of eight children's books. The series is entitled Die kleine Spinne Widerlich.

Films 
 2000: Auszeit - Blanka
 2001: Mädchen, Mädchen - Inken
 2002: Stuart Little 2 - Margalo's voice in the German version
 2002: Ganz und gar - Alex
 2002: Knallharte Jungs - Maja Paradis
 2004: Mädchen, Mädchen 2 – Loft oder Liebe - Inken
 2005: Princes(s) - Stella (short film)
 2005: Die drei Musketiere - Constance Bonacieux (TV film, ZDF, ORF)
 2007: Der geheimnisvolle Schwiegersohn - Greta Litschka (TV film, Sat.1)
 2009: Monsters vs. Aliens - Susan Gigantika’s voice in the German version
 2009: Kein Geist für alle Fälle - Jana (TV film, Sat.1)
 2009: Der Bulle und das Landei - Kati Biever (TV film, ARD)
 2010: Liebe und andere Delikatessen - Franka Lauth (TV film, ARD)
 2010: Teufelskicker - Moritz's mother
 2011: Plötzlich fett! - Eva
 2012:  - Andrea Schnidt
 2013: 
 2014: Wir tun es für Geld - Ines Herzog (TV film, Ziegler)
 2014: Die Vampirschwestern 2 – Fledermäuse im Bauch
 2016: Die Vampirschwestern 3 – Reise nach Transsilvanien

TV 
 1999: Eine Liebe auf Mallorca
 1999: Eine Liebe auf Mallorca 2
 1999: Unschuldige Biester
 1999: Zwei Männer am Herd (TV series)
 2000–2007: SOKO 5113 on ZDF - multiple episodes
 2000: Eine Liebe auf Mallorca 3
 2002: Das Traumschiff – Chile
 2004: Vernunft & Gefühl
 2005: Zivile Jungs – Helden in Unterhosen (first broadcast in 2008 as Zwei Zivis zum Knutschen)
 2006–2008: Maja Comedy on Sat.1 Comedy - Maja
 2007 Der geheimnisvolle Schwiegersohn - Greta Litschka
 2007: Die ProSieben Märchenstunde – Die Prinzessin auf der Erbse (ProSieben - Vroni
 2007: Innere Werte
 2007–2011: Doctor’s Diary - series on RTL/ORF - Dr. Gretchen Haase
 2008: Utta Danella – Das Geheimnis unserer Liebe
 2008: Im 7. Himmel – Nachricht von Tom 
 2010: Kein Geist für alle Fälle (Sat.1)
 2010: Der Bulle und das Landei (Eifel-Krimi des SWR)
 2010: Liebe und andere Delikatessen (ARD)
 2011: Plötzlich fett!
 2011: Der Bulle und das Landei: Babyblues
 2013: Christine. Perfekt war gestern! as Christine (main role)
 2014-: Josephine Klick - Allein unter Cops (main role)

Awards 
 2009 Bayerischer Fernsehpreis as best actress in the category series for her role in the series Doctor’s Diary

References

External links
 

1975 births
Living people
People from Gütersloh
German children's writers
21st-century German women writers
German women children's writers
German stage actresses
German television actresses
German film actresses
21st-century German actresses